White Hall, Maryland may refer to:
White Hall, Baltimore County, Maryland, an unincorporated community in Baltimore County
White Hall, Cecil County, Maryland, an unincorporated community in Cecil County
White Hall, Prince George's County, Maryland, an unincorporated community in Prince George's County

See also
Whitehall, Maryland (disambiguation)